Poplar Creek is a  long 2nd order tributary to the Dan River in Halifax County, Virginia.

Course 
Poplar Creek rises in a pond at Centerville, Virginia, and then flows generally southeast to join the Dan River at South Boston.

Watershed 
Poplar Creek drains  of area, receives about 45.6 in/year of precipitation, has a wetness index of 392.35, and is about 29% forested.

See also 
 List of Virginia Rivers

References

Watershed Maps 

Rivers of Virginia
Rivers of Halifax County, Virginia
Tributaries of the Roanoke River